Maharashtra Security Force (MSF) is a  government security agency in Maharashtra, India, which was established in 2010 under Maharashtra State Security Corporation Act, 2010.

Maharashtra Security Force was established with the purpose to provide better protection and security to the Government of Maharashtra State and Central Government offices, undertakings, employees of all such establishments and public sector undertakings in Maharashtra state.

Maharashtra State Security Corporation (MSSC) is a corporate body, which is headed by an Indian Police Service (IPS) officer of Director General of Police.

See also 
 Central Industrial Security Force 
 Border Security Force
 National Security Guard

References 

State law enforcement agencies of India
Law enforcement in Maharashtra
 
Government agencies established in 2010